Ghana have competed at sixteen Commonwealth Games, beginning in 1954 and missing only the 1986 Games in Edinburgh. Ghana have won fifty-seven medals at the Commonwealth Games, including fifteen gold, with all but one of their medals coming in athletics and boxing.

Medals

References

 
Nations at the Commonwealth Games